Three ships of the British Royal Navy have been named HMS Polyphemus, after the Polyphemus of Greek mythology.

  was a 64-gun third rate launched in 1782, active in the Napoleonic Wars, converted to a powder hulk in 1813 and broken up in 1827.
  was a wooden paddlewheel sloop launched in 1840 and wrecked off Jutland in 1856.
  was a torpedo ram in use from 1881 to 1903.
 HMS Polyphemus was to have been a  cruiser.

Royal Navy ship names